An eku (sometimes spelled eiku or ieku) is an ancient weapon of Okinawan kobudō.

Its first intended purpose is as an oar.

See also
 Taiaha

References

External links
 Article, images & video on Eku (Okinawa Prefectural Government website)

Weapons of Okinawa
Blunt weapons
Ancient weapons